Ulrika Maria Toft Hansen, born Ågren, (born 13 July 1987) is a Swedish retired handball player.

She participated at the 2011 World Women's Handball Championship in Brazil and the 2012 Summer Olympics, and was a national team player between 2011 and 2017.

Personal life
Ulrika Toft Hansen is married to Danish handballer Henrik Toft Hansen. They became parents to a boy, Oliver in November 2015 and to a girl, Ida in July 2018.

References

1987 births
Living people
Swedish female handball players
Handball players at the 2012 Summer Olympics
Olympic handball players of Sweden
Expatriate handball players
Swedish expatriate sportspeople in Denmark
Swedish expatriate sportspeople in Germany
IK Sävehof players